¿Quién te quiere a ti? ("Who Loves You?") is a 1941 Mexican film. It stars Sara García.

External links
 

1941 films
1940s Spanish-language films
Mexican black-and-white films
Mexican comedy-drama films
1941 comedy-drama films
1940s Mexican films